The 2018 UTSA Roadrunners football team represented the University of Texas at San Antonio in the 2018 NCAA Division I FBS football season. The Roadrunners played their home games at the Alamodome in San Antonio, TX, and competed in the West Division of Conference USA (C–USA). They were led by third-year head coach Frank Wilson. They finished the season 3–9, 2–6 in C-USA play to finish in fifth place in the West Division.

Previous season
The Roadrunners finished the 2017 season 6–5, 3–5 in C-USA play to finish in fifth place in the West Division. Despite being bowl eligible for the second consecutive season, the Roadrunners did not receive a bowl bid.

Preseason

Award watch lists

Preseason All-CUSA team
Conference USA released their preseason all-CUSA team on July 16, 2018, with the Roadrunners having two players selected.

Defense

Kevin Strong – DL

Josiah Tauaefa – LB

Preseason media poll
Conference USA released their preseason media poll on July 17, 2018, with the Roadrunners predicted to finish in fifth place in the West Division.

Schedule

Schedule Source:

Game summaries

at Arizona State

Baylor

at Kansas State

UTSA's defense gave up over 400 yards to Kansas State and dropped their record to 0-3, where Kansas State advanced to 2-1 for the season. UTSA head coach Frank Wilson said, "Unfortunately we did not always execute to the fullest, but I think take away a couple of big-play opportunities, they weren't going methodically down the field and just shoving us around. We held them to some third-down opportunities, but we just couldn't get them off the field."

Texas State

UTEP

at Rice

Louisiana Tech

at Southern Miss

at UAB

FIU

at Marshall

North Texas

References

UTSA
UTSA Roadrunners football seasons
UTSA Roadrunners football